Coleophora pulchricornis is a moth of the family Coleophoridae. It is found in Florida, United States. It has also been recorded from the Antilles.

The larvae feed on Saccharum officinarum.

References

pulchricornis
Moths of North America
Moths described in 1897